The Perkins 4.236 is a diesel engine manufactured by Perkins Engines. First produced in 1964,over 70,000 were produced in the first three years, and production increased to 60,000 units per annum. The engine was both innovative (using direct injection) and reliable, becoming a worldwide sales success over several decades.

The Perkins 4.236 is rated at  ASE (DIN), and is widely used in Massey Ferguson tractors, as well as other well-known industrial and agricultural machines, e.g. Clark, Manitou, JCB, Landini and Vermeer.

The designation "4.236" 
The designation 4.236 arose as follows: "4" represents four cylinders, "236" represents , which is the total displacement of the engine. This logic can be used for most of Perkins engine designations.

Applications
The Massey Ferguson tractors that were originally fitted with this engine are: 168S, 175, 175S, (174 - Romanian model). Later came the 261, 265, 275, 365, 375, 384S. Volvo Trucks used this engine in their Snabbe and Trygge trucks beginning in 1967; they called it the D39.

A now defunct American car manufacturer, Checker Motors Corporation of Kalamazoo, Mich., offered the 4.236 in their Checker Marathon, as an option in 1969 only.

Also the Dodge 50 Series received this engine, from July 1979 until July 1987 as the 4.236 and also between July 1986 and July 1987 in turbocharged T38-specification. It was also fitted as an option for Renault 50 Series vehicles. In Brazil, the locally developed Puma trucks received the Perkins 4.236 engine, with a maximum of  DIN. Brazilian versions of the Chevrolet C/K series also relied on the Perkins 4.236 throughout the 80's as its only Diesel option.

The Vermeer BC1250 brush chipper used this engine until the BC1250A replaced it. The BC1250A used the turbocharged version of the same engine.

In Republic of Korea, Hyundai Motor Company produced this engine under license by Perkins in 1977 to 1981 and Hyundai Bison Truck(HD3000, HD5000) equipped it as called 'HD4236'.

Long-term liveaboard sailors Bill & Laurel Cooper installed three Perkins 4.236 engines with three screws and stern gear into their 88' schooner-rigged Dutch barge, Hosanna. Having three engines (using just one on a calm canal, but engaging the other two in fast rivers or for manoeuvering) was still cheaper than having an equivalent single  engine such as a Cummins or Volvo.

Specification
Idle speed: 750 rpm, Rated speed: 2,000 rpm, Max. torque at 1,300 rpm
Early models were fitted with Lucas M50 electric starter and Lucas dynamo charger.

See also
 List of Perkins engines

References

Dodge 50 website

Perkins engines
Diesel engines by model
Automobile engines
Straight-four engines